SS Cathay was a P&O passenger steamship that was built in Scotland in 1925 and sunk in the Mediterranean Sea in 1942. In the Second World War she was first an armed merchant cruiser and then a troop ship. In 1942 she took part in Operation Torch, and was sunk in a German air raid off Bougie, Algeria.

Cathay was the first of a class of three ocean liners for P&O, all built at the same time. Her sister ships  were Comorin and Chitral.

This was the second of three P&O liners called Cathay. The first was a compound steamship that was built in Scotland in 1872 and scrapped in Japan in 1903. The third was a steam turbine ship that P&O owned between 1961 and 1976. She was built in Belgium in 1957 as Baudouinville. In 1976 P&O sold her to China, where she was renamed first Kengshin and then Shanghai.

Building
Until 1914, P&O maintained a regular fortnightly liner service between Britain and Australia. But the company lost several ships in First World War, so after the Armistice it was able to restore only a monthly service on the route.

In the early 1920s P&O ordered several new passenger liners, of different sizes, for its various routes. It ordered Cathay and her sisters in 1923.

Barclay Curle & Company in Glasgow built Cathay and Comorin, and launched them on the same day, 31 October 1924. Lady Inchcape, the wife of P&O Chairman The Earl of Inchcape, performed the launching ceremony for Cathay. Alexander Stephen and Sons built Chitral, launching her on 27 January 1925.

Cathay was the first of the three sisters to be completed. She passed her sea trials on 12 March 1925. Comorin was completed that April and Alexander Stephen & Sons completed Chitral in June.

Cathay and her sisters each had a cruiser stern, whereas P&O ships built before the First World War had counter sterns.

Cathay had twin screws. Each screw was driven by a four-cylinder quadruple-expansion steam engine. She had two funnels. The after one was a dummy.

Cathay had berths for 306 passengers: 203 in First Class and 103 in Second Class. One of Inchcape's daughters, the Honourable Elsie Mackay, supervised the interior décor of the passenger accommodation.

P&O registered Cathay at Glasgow. Her UK official number was 148843 and her code letters were KSHB.

Civilian career

Cathay began her maiden voyage from London to Sydney on 27 March 1925. Her regular route between Britain and Australia was via the Suez Canal. Within months of entering service, Cathay suffered a leak from her bunkers, causing heavy fuel oil to damage her cargo of meat. This led to a lengthy lawsuit.

Cathay continued to serve the route, but from 1932 she additionally called at Bombay, and occasionally served P&O's Far East route.

In 1934 there was a worldwide reorganisation of merchant ship identification. Cathays code letters KSHB were replaced with the new maritime call sign GCDF.

On 14 December 1933 Cathay lost her starboard propeller while trying to make up time between Colombo and Fremantle. She waited in Australia until Strathnaver brought a new one from Britain. She was dry docked in Sutherland Dock at Cockatoo Island Dockyard for repairs, and she returned to service in March 1934.

By 1936 Cathay had been equipped with an echo sounding device.

Armed merchant cruiser
On 25 August 1939 the Admiralty requisitioned Cathay. She was converted at Bombay into an armed merchant cruiser. Her dummy second funnel was removed. She was given a primary armament of eight BL 6-inch Mk XII guns. Her secondary armament included two QF 3-inch 20 cwt anti-aircraft guns. Her conversion was completed in October 1939, and she was commissioned as HMS Cathay.

From November 1939 Cathay patrolled in the Indian Ocean, calling at Bombay, Aden, Colombo, Trincomalee, Durban and Mombasa. Between June and August 1940 her duties also included escorting two convoys from Bombay to Suez.

In August 1940 Cathay transferred to the Atlantic. She undertook patrols, and escorted convoys between Freetown in Sierra Leone and either Liverpool or the Clyde.

Survivors from Anselm

Cathay was one of the escorts of Convoy WS 9B, which left Liverpool on 29 June 1941. Also in the convoy was the troop ship , but shortly after departure the latter returned to port for repairs. Anselm later resumed her voyage, escorted by the survey vessel  and s Lavender,  and Starwort.

On 4 July 1941 Cathay detached from convoy WS 9B to patrol. She sank in 22 minutes, with the loss of 254 passengers and crew. 1,061 people survived, either in her lifeboats or rescued by her escorts, leaving the latter badly overloaded.

Cathay met the escorts, and 900 of the survivors were then transferred to her. She landed them at Freetown on 14 July.

Cathays last convoy as an armed merchant cruiser escort was WS 12 from the Clyde to Freetown in October 1941. She then crossed the Atlantic from Freetown via Halifax, Nova Scotia to New York, where she arrived on 14 October.

Troop ship
On 5 February 1942 the Admiralty returned Cathay to P&O. The Bethlehem Steel Corporation refitted her in Brooklyn as a troop ship. She entered service again on 30 April 1942, leaving New York for Halifax, NS, where she joined eastbound Convoy NA 8. She carried 3,048 troops, and reached Belfast on 11 May.

On 31 May 1942 Cathay left the Clyde carrying 3,734 troops as part of Convoy WS 19P. The convoy called at Freetown and Cape Town, and Cathay continued with part of the convoy to Bombay. She returned via Durban, Cape Town and Freetown to the Clyde, where she arrived on 18 September.

Operation Torch
On 26 October 1942 Cathay left the Clyde in Convoy KMF 1. This was the landing force to launch Operation Torch, Allied invasion of French North Africa. On 7 November 1942 she landed troops west of Algiers.

At 1:30 pm on 11 November 1942, as Cathay was landing troops at Bougie, when German aircraft bombed her. The air raid killed one person. She was hit four times, and at 7:00 pm the order was given to abandon ship. At 10:00 pm a delayed action bomb exploded in her galley, starting a serious fire. At 7:00 am on 12 November, Cathays ammunition exploded and blew off her stern. By 10:00 am she had capsized to starboard side and sunk.

All but one of Cathays crew survived. At first some of the survivors were billeted aboard the British Indian SN Co ship Karanja, until enemy aircraft sank her too on 12 November. They were then transferred to P&O's Strathnaver.

References

Bibliography

External links

1924 ships
World War II Auxiliary cruisers of the Royal Navy
Maritime incidents in November 1942
Passenger ships of the United Kingdom
Ships built on the River Clyde
Ships of P&O (company)
Ships sunk by German aircraft
Steamships of the United Kingdom
Troop ships of the United Kingdom
World War II merchant ships of the United Kingdom
World War II shipwrecks in the Mediterranean Sea